Signature Healthcare Brockton Hospital is a 216-bed hospital located in Brockton, Massachusetts.

Brockton Hospital is equipped with the Helen Greene Cardiac Catheterization Suite. The cardiac suite is equipped to perform Intravascular Ultrasounds, AngioJets, Radial Stenting, Advanced X-Rays, and more. It was donated in 2007 by the W.B. Mason Company.  The hospital is affiliated with the Floating Hospital for Children at Tufts Medical Center.

References

1896 establishments in Massachusetts
Hospitals in Plymouth County, Massachusetts
Brockton, Massachusetts